KazSat-2 (QazSat-2) is the second Kazakh communications satellite after KazSat-1. It was launched on 16 July 2011, at 23:16:10 UTC by Proton-M / Briz-M launch vehicle. This satellite was constructed by Khrunichev State Research and Production Space Center for the satellite bus and Thales Alenia Space (Italy) for the payload. Thales Alenia Space is also the provider of KazSat-1 and KazSat-3 payloads.

See also 

 KazSat-1
 KazSat-3

References

External links 
 Frequency Chart of KazSat 2
 KazSat 2
 First Kazakh satellite into orbit

Communications satellites in geostationary orbit
Satellites using the Yakhta bus
Satellites of Kazakhstan
Communications in Kazakhstan
Spacecraft launched in 2011
2011 in Kazakhstan